Elections to Brentwood Borough Council were held on 3 May 2007.  One third of the council was up for election.

After the election, the composition of the council was
 Conservative 28
 Liberal Democrat 6
 Labour 3

Election result

The swing was 4.4% from the Conservatives to the Liberal Democrats.

Ward results

Composition of expiring seats before election

External links
 Brentwood Council

2007
2007 English local elections
2000s in Essex